The Significant Weather Observing Program (SWOP) was created at the National Weather Service (NWS) Weather Forecast Office (WFO) in Central Illinois in order to provide forecasters with additional data during and after significant weather events.

See also
 Community Collaborative Rain, Hail and Snow Network (CoCoRaHS)
 Citizen Weather Observer Program (CWOP)
 Skywarn
 Cooperative Observer Program

References

External links
 SWOP website

Meteorological data and networks